The Minister of Culture leads the Ministry of Culture. The list shows also the ministers that served under the same office but with other names, in fact this Ministry has changed name many times.

The current Minister is Gennaro Sangiuliano, who is serving since 22 October 2022 in the government of Giorgia Meloni. The longest-serving minister of culture is Dario Franceschini, of the Democratic Party.

List of Ministers

Parties

Coalitions

Timeline

External links
Ministero per i Beni e le Attività Culturali e per il Turismo, Official website of the Ministry

References

 
Lists of government ministers of Italy
Culture ministers